Laurence Douglas Fink (born November 2, 1952) is an American billionaire businessman. He is the current chairman and CEO of BlackRock, an American multinational investment management corporation. BlackRock is the largest money-management firm in the world with more than  trillion in assets under management, giving the firm enormous power over the global financial system. In April 2022, Fink's net worth was estimated at  billion according to Forbes Magazine. He sits on the boards of the Council on Foreign Relations and World Economic Forum.

Early life and education
Fink was born on November 2, 1952. He grew up one of three children in a Jewish family in Van Nuys, California, where his mother Lila (1930-2012) was an English professor and his father Frederick (1925-2013) owned a shoe store. He earned a BA in Political Science from UCLA in 1974. Fink is also a member of Kappa Beta Phi. He then received an MBA in Real Estate at the UCLA Anderson Graduate School of Management in 1976.

Career

1970 to 2000

Fink started his career in 1976 at First Boston, a New York-based investment bank, where he was one of the first mortgage-backed security traders and eventually managed the firm's bond department. At First Boston, Fink was a member of the management committee, a managing director, and co-head of the Taxable Fixed Income Division; he also started the Financial Futures and Options Department, and headed the Mortgage and Real Estate Products Group.

Fink added "by some estimates" $1 billion to First Boston's bottom line. He was successful at the bank until 1986, when his department lost $100 million due to his incorrect prediction about interest rates. The experience influenced his decision to start a company that would invest clients' money while also incorporating comprehensive risk management.

In 1988, under the corporate umbrella of The Blackstone Group, Fink co-founded BlackRock and became its director and CEO. When BlackRock split from Blackstone in 1994, Fink retained his positions, which he continued to hold after BlackRock became more independent in 1998. His other positions at the company have included chairman of the board, chairman of the executive and leadership committees, chair of corporate council, and co-chair of the global client committee. BlackRock went public in 1999.

2000s 
 
In 2003, Fink helped to negotiate the resignation of the CEO of the New York Stock Exchange, Richard Grasso, who was widely criticized for his $190 million pay package. In 2006 Fink led the merger with Merrill Lynch Investment Managers, which doubled BlackRock's asset management portfolio. That same year, BlackRock's $5.4 billion purchase of Stuyvesant Town–Peter Cooper Village, a Manhattan housing complex, became the largest residential-real-estate deal in U.S. history. When the project ended in default, BlackRock clients lost their money, including the California Pension and Retirement System, which lost about $500 million.

The U.S. government contracted with BlackRock to help clean up after the financial meltdown of 2008. Fink's longstanding relationships with senior government officials have led to questions about potential conflict of interest regarding government contracts awarded without competitive bidding. BlackRock's contract allowed Fink to cultivate relationships with Obama's first Treasury Secretary Tim Geithner and additional members of the Obama economic recovery team. In 2016 Fink hoped to become part of the federal government himself as Hillary Clinton's Treasury Secretary. At the same time, Blackrock hired many former executive branch appointees to its firm including Cheryl Mills, 
Christopher Meade, Katheryn Rosen, Michael Pyle, Coryann Stefansson, Gary Reeder, and Ken Wilson. This move strengthened BlackRock's revolving door with the federal government.

In December 2009, BlackRock purchased Barclays Global Investors, at which point the company became the largest money-management firm in the world. Despite his great influence, Fink is not widely known publicly, apart from his regular appearances on CNBC. BlackRock paid Fink $23.6 million in 2010, and $36 million in 2021. By 2016, BlackRock had $5 trillion under management, with 12,000 employees in 27 countries.

In 2016, Fink received the ABANA Achievement Award in New York City. It recognizes an individual who exemplifies outstanding leadership in banking and finance and has a commitment to positive professional cooperation between the US and the Middle East and North Africa.

In 2018, Fink was ranked #28 on the Forbes list of The World's Most Powerful People.

During the coronavirus pandemic of 2020 the Fed has turned to BlackRock to help it purchase distressed securities in an echo of 2008.

Community involvement
Fink serves on the board of trustees of New York University, where he holds various chairmanships including chair of the Financial Affairs Committee. He also co-chairs the NYU Langone Medical Center board of trustees and is a trustee of the Boys and Girls Club of New York. Fink is also on the board of the Robin Hood Foundation. Fink founded the Lori and Laurence Fink Center for Finance & Investments at UCLA Anderson in 2009, and currently serves as chairman of the board.

In December 2016, Fink joined a business forum assembled by then president-elect Donald Trump to provide strategic and policy advice on economic issues.

In his 2018 annual open letter to CEOs, he called for corporations to play an active role in improving the environment, working to better their communities, and increasing the diversity of their workforces.  This has been taken as evidence of a move by BlackRock, one of the largest public investors, to proactively enforce these targets. In his 2019 open letter, Fink said that companies and their CEOs must step into a leadership vacuum to tackle social and political issues when governments fail to address these issues.

After the murder of Jamal Khashoggi in October 2018, Fink cancelled plans to attend an investment conference in Saudi Arabia.

In his 2020 annual open letter, Fink announced environmental sustainability as core goal for BlackRock's future investment decisions. In this letter, he explained how climate will become a driver in economics, affecting all aspects of the economy. He also divulged in a separate letter (to investors) that BlackRock will be cutting ties with previous investments involving thermal coal and other investments that have a large environmental risk.

Larry Fink is also longtime donor and supporter of the New York City Police Foundation: a group that provides financial support to the New York City Police Department. The non-profit Color of Change called on Fink to divest from the NYC Police Foundation in the wake of the murder of George Floyd and subsequent nationwide protests.

Personal life
Fink has been married to his wife Lori, his high-school sweetheart, since 1974. The couple has three children. Joshua, their eldest son, was CEO of Enso Capital, a now defunct hedge fund in which Fink had a stake. The Finks own homes in Manhattan, North Salem, New York, and Vail, Colorado.

Fink is a lifelong supporter of the Democratic Party.

Public perception 
In his 2018 annual letter to shareholders, Fink stated that other companies should be aware of their impact on society; however, antiwar organizations were discontented with Fink's statement because his company, BlackRock, is the largest investor in weapon manufacturers through its U.S. Aerospace and Defense ETF. In September 2018, an activist with the U.S. non-profit organization Code Pink confronted Fink onstage at the Yahoo Finance All Markets Summit.

Climate change 
In December 2021, BlackRock teamed up with a Saudi asset manager to pay $15.5 billion to buy and then lease back pipelines to Saudi Aramco.

However, Fink has been largely vocal on companies taking action on climate change, and in an open letter in 2022 stated “Every company and every industry will be transformed by the transition to a net-zero world. The question is, will you lead, or will you be led?”.

In 2022, Fink was named one of the US' top "climate villains" by The Guardian due to BlackRock profiting from deforestation.

Honors 
2007, Golden Plate Award of the American Academy of Achievement
2015, Appeal of Conscience Award
2015, Americas Society Gold Medal
2016, UCLA Medal
2019, Charles Schwab Financial Innovation Award

References

External links

Membership at Trilateral Commission
Board of Trustees at World Economic Forum
Board of Directors at Council on Foreign Relations
Lori and Laurence Fink Center for Finance & Investments

1952 births
American billionaires
American chief executives of financial services companies
American financial company founders
American financiers
American hedge fund managers
20th-century American Jews
American money managers
BlackRock people
Businesspeople from Los Angeles
California Democrats
Jewish American bankers
Living people
New York (state) Democrats
New York University people
People from North Salem, New York
UCLA Anderson School of Management alumni
21st-century American Jews